Waste Connections is a North American integrated waste services company that provides waste collection, transfer, disposal and recycling services, primarily of solid waste.  It has operations in both the United States and Canada. Its headquarters is located in The Woodlands, Texas.  It is the third largest waste management company in North America. Near the end of 2018, the company removed "Inc." from its corporate name. The company is now known simply as "Waste Connections".

History 
The company was founded in 1997, by a group of professionals in Washington and Idaho with industry related experience. Waste Connections, Inc. expanded very quickly. Within about a year of its founding the company decided to go public, launching its IPO in May 1998. The company then slowly expanded into California and the western United States. As of 2011, It had operations in 32 of the 50 U.S states. In December 2011, the company announced that it was moving its headquarters from Folsom, CA to The Woodlands, Texas, a suburb of Houston. Chief Executive Officer, Ron Mittelstaedt, cited California's high taxes and dysfunctional legislature as key reasons for the move.

In September 2012, it acquired R360 Environmental Solutions, a Texas waste company specializing in the oil industry.  In January 2016, Waste Connections bought Progressive Waste Services of Canada for $2.67 billion.  Under the deal, Waste Connections shareholders received 70% of the new company, which moved its tax headquarters to Canada.  It later re-branded its Canadian division Waste Connections of Canada.

Operations
Waste Connections's primary business is to provide solid waste collection and disposal services.  It most often does this through contracts with municipalities to collect the waste in that municipality, for an agreed-upon rate.  It also provides services directly to residential, commercial, or industrial customers.  In addition, Waste Connections runs landfills for waste disposal (82 solid waste landfills as of September 2019).

In Q3 2017, 67% of revenue was from solid waste collection, 21% from solid waste disposal and transfer, 4% from recycling, 5% from its oil industry waste operations, and 3% from other sources.  16% of revenue was from Canada, with the rest from the United States.

Controversy

In September 2019, the investigative journalism program CBC Marketplace installed trackers into bales of plastic and commissioned three plastic recycling companies to process them: GFL Environmental, Merlin Plastics, and Waste Connections Canada. Merlin Plastics shredded and recycled the bales and GFL Environmental incinerated the bales in a waste-to-energy facility. Trackers indicated that Waste Connections dumped the plastic bales into a landfill in Richmond and a junkyard in Surrey, British Columbia instead of recycling them. The company responded "There was some miscommunication and the driver took this load to a waste facility."

Corporate structure and leadership
Waste Connections' senior leadership is structured as follows:
 Ronald J. Mittelstaedt, Executive Chairman
 Worthing Jackman, CEO and President
 Darrell W. Chambliss, Executive Vice President and COO

References

External links
 

Companies listed on the Toronto Stock Exchange
Companies based in Ontario
Waste management companies of Canada
Tax inversions